Miaoulis may refer to:

People with the surname
Andreas Vokos Miaoulis (1769-1835), Greek admiral and politician
 Dimitrios Miaoulis (1784–1836), son of Andreas
 Antonios Miaoulis (1800–1836), son of Andreas
 Ioannis Miaoulis (1803–1830), brother of Andreas
 Emmanouil Miaoulis (1812–1871), brother of Andreas
 Athanasios Miaoulis (1815–1867), brother of Andreas
 Nikolaos Miaoulis (1818–1872), brother of Andreas
 Andreas Miaoulis (born 1819) (1819–1887), son of Dimitrios
 Dimitrios D. Miaoulis (1836–1899), son of Dimitrios
Emmanouil A. Miaoulis, son of Antonios
 Andreas A. Miaoulis (1830–?), son of Antonios
 Nikolaos Vokos (1854–1902), son of Emmanouil
 Ioannis A. Miaoulis (1850–1913), son of Andreas D. Miaoulis
 Athanasios N. Miaoulis (1865–1936), son of Nikolaos D. Miaoulis
 Andreas Miaoulis (born 1869) (1869–?), son of Dimitrios D. Miaoulis

Other
 Miaoulis (cannonade), a gunboat of the Royal Greek Navy
Greek cruiser Navarchos Miaoulis, an 1879 cruiser of the Royal Greek Navy
 Greek destroyer Miaoulis (L91), a World War II-era destroyer of the Greek Navy
 Greek destroyer Miaoulis (D-211), a Greek Gearing-class destroyer
Akti Miaouli, an area of the Port of Piraeus
Miaoulis (shoal), a shoal in the Ionian Sea

Greek-language surnames